Presidential elections were held in Liberia in May 1875. The result was a victory for former President James Spriggs Payne of the Republican Party. Payne took office on 3 January 1876.

References

Liberia
1875 in Liberia
Elections in Liberia
May 1875 events
Election and referendum articles with incomplete results